Coalville TMD was a traction maintenance depot located in Coalville, Leicestershire, England.  The depot was situated on the Leicester to Burton upon Trent Line and was near the now closed Coalville Town station.

References 

 Railway depots in England
Rail transport in Leicestershire
Coalville